Başar Oktar (born May 19, 2002) is a Turkish figure skater. He is the 2017 Denkova-Staviski Cup silver medalist on the senior level.

Career

Early career 
Oktar began learning to skate in 2008 at a mall. After winning his first junior national title, he was selected to compete at the 2016 World Junior Championships in Debrecen, Hungary. His short program placement, 31st, was not enough to qualify to the free skate.

2016–2017 season 
Oktar debuted on the ISU Junior Grand Prix (JGP) series in August 2016 in France. He placed 18th at the French event and later 14th in Estonia. In February 2017, he finished fourth at the European Youth Olympic Winter Festival in Erzurum, Turkey. A month later, he placed 26th in the short program at the 2017 World Junior Championships in Taipei, Taiwan.

2017–2018 season 
In September, Oktar competed at two 2017 JGP events, finishing fourth in Austria and sixth in Croatia. His senior international debut came in November at the Denkova-Staviski Cup in Bulgaria. He won the silver medal behind Kevin Aymoz from France. He finished the 2017-18 season at 51st in the world ranking.

2018–2019 season 
Oktar opened his season on the ISU Junior Grand Prix series, placing 13th in Canada and 11th in Slovenia. In December, he received bronze medals at Bosphorus Cup in Istanbul behind Morisi Kvitelashvili and Ivan Shmuratko. 

In March, Oktar qualified to the final segment at the 2019 World Junior Championships in Zagreb, Croatia. He was the first male skater that qualified for the free program. He ranked 19th in the short program, 16th in the free skate, and 19st overall.

2019–2020 season 
Oktar changed his coach before the season and moved to Ankara. He finished tenth at Junior Grand Prix events in both Riga and Zagreb. He won the silver medal at Bosphorus Cup in Istanbul, earning a national record of 209.54 points. In March, Oktar qualified to the final segment at the 2020 World Junior Championships in Tallinn, Estonia, and again finished the competition in 19th.

2020–2021 season 
In October, after the COVID-19 pandemic required a lockdown for all sports activities, Oktar made his senior national debut at Ataturk Cup in Kocaeli and won the gold medal. Competing at the 2021 Turkish Championships, he took the silver medal. He competed in his first ISU Challenger Series event, the 2020 CS Budapest Trophy, where he placed fourth. He also placed fifth at the 2021 Challenge Cup in the Netherlands, setting a national record of 217.05 points in total. Oktar was selected to compete for the Turkish Figure Skating Federation at the 2021 World Championships in Stockholm, where he placed twenty-eighth.

2021–2022 season 
Oktar was the designated Turkish qualifying entry at the 2021 CS Nebelhorn Trophy to try to secure a berth for the 2022 Winter Olympics. He finished in tenth position, 0.06 points behind fellow Turkish skater Burak Demirboğa and making Turkey the first alternate for the Olympic Games. He went on to place twentieth at the 2021 CS Cup of Austria.

Programs

Competitive highlights 
CS: Challenger Series; JGP: Junior Grand Prix

References

External links 

 
 Başar Oktar at tracings.net
 Başar Oktar at rinkresults.com

2002 births
Turkish male single skaters
Living people
Sportspeople from Antalya